Canterbury was a rapid transit station on the Chicago "L" between 1930 and 1951. Located on the Westchester branch, it was part of a southern extension of the branch, which had opened in 1926.

History
The Westchester branch opened in 1926, and was extended south to Mannheim/22nd on December 1, 1930, an extension that included Canterbury. This extension was served by a single car that shuttled passengers to and from Roosevelt; this was replaced in 1933 by a through-car service that coupled and uncoupled from Westchester trains at Roosevelt.

The branch continued in service until replaced by a bus service on December 9, 1951.

Station details
The station had a single platform on the west side of the single track. The station house, which abutted the platform to its south and opened to the street, was of a Tudor Revival look, with arched windows on the walls and timbered eaves in the interior.

Ridership
Detailed ridership statistics were never collected for Canterbury; such statistics were collected for the Westchester branch as a whole, or for more patronized stations on the branch.

References

Works cited

Defunct Chicago "L" stations
1930 establishments in Illinois
1951 disestablishments in Illinois
Railway stations opened in 1930
Railway stations closed in 1951